Sorgenfreispira moronii is an extinct species of sea snail, a marine gastropod mollusk in the family Mangeliidae.

Description

Distribution
This extinct species was found in Miocene strata in Italy.

References

moronii
Gastropods described in 1964